Primula stricta, also known as the strict primrose, is a species of flowering plant in the family Primulaceae.

Description
The species has basal rosette of leaves, which possess glandular hairs on their underside. Flowers stand on straight leafless stems, usually there are five flowers per stem. The petals are pink, however yellow and white is also present towards the centre of the flower.

Distribution
The native range of P. stricta is confined to the northern hemisphere. It is a native to the countries of Finland, Greenland, Iceland, Norway, Sweden, Siberia (Western) and Russia (Northern European).

It can also be found throughout many of the following Canadian provinces: Labrador, Manitoba, Newfoundland, Northwest Territories, Ontario, Nunavut, and Québec.

Habitat
Primula stricta inhabits coastal and exposed habitats such as rocky outcrops, shingle shores and saltmarshes. It can also be found growing near to bodies of freshwater such as rivers, lakes and streams in poor quality soils.

This species is found at altitudes ranging from 0 - 300m above sea level.

References

stricta